Viadanica is a comune (municipality) in the Province of Bergamo in the Italian region of Lombardy, located about  northeast of Milan and about  east of Bergamo.

Viadanica borders the following municipalities: Adrara San Martino, Predore, Sarnico, Vigolo.

Demographic evolution

References